Field of Honor is a 1987 French war film directed by Jean-Pierre Denis. It was entered into the 1987 Cannes Film Festival.

Plot 
In France, impoverished sharecropper Pierre (Cris Campion) is spared military service when he draws an exemption via a draft lottery. Needing money more than his freedom, however, Pierre sells his exemption to the son of wealthy aristocrat Arnaud (Eric Wapler), taking the son's place in the draft. When the Franco-Prussian War erupts, Pierre finds himself wounded inside enemy territory and gains an unlikely ally in a German soldier who also entered the war as a replacement.

Cast
 Cris Campion as Pierre Naboulet
 Pascale Rocard as Henriette
 Eric Wapler as Arnaud Florent
 Frédéric Mayer as The Child
 André Wilms as The peddler
 Marcelle Dessalles as Pierre's Mother
 Marion Audier as Pierre's Sister
 Robert Sandrey as Florent's Father
 Lily Genny as Florent's Mother
 Louis-Marie Taillefer as Gang Leader
 François Segura as Roger
 Jacques Arne
 Jean-Pierre Beaudeau
 Gisèle Boubou

References

External links

1987 films
1980s French-language films
French war films
Films directed by Jean-Pierre Denis
Franco-Prussian War films
1980s war films
1980s French films